Binetto is a town and comune in the Metropolitan City of Bari, Apulia, southern Italy.

References

Cities and towns in Apulia